The Ústí massacre (German: Massaker von Aussig) was a lynching of ethnic Germans in Ústí nad Labem (Aussig an der Elbe), a largely ethnic German city in northern Bohemia ("Sudetenland"), shortly after the end of World War II, on 31 July 1945. During the incident, at least 43 Germans were killed (confirmed body count) but the estimated numbers range from 80 to thousands of victims.

Intelligence officer and police commandant Bedřich Pokorný, who previously took part in the organisation of so called Brno death march in May 1945, has been sometimes accused of organizing this massacre towards the end of the Potsdam conference (17 July to 2 August 1945) after the government had halted such acts.

On 31 July 2005, the mayor of Ústí unveiled a memorial plaque on the bridge with the text "In the memory of victims of violence on 31 July 1945" (photographs).

Cause and conflict
On July 31, at 15:30, an ammunition dump in the part of the city called Krásné Březno exploded. The death toll was 26 or 27 people (7 of them Czechs), dozens were injured.

Immediately after the explosion, a massacre of ethnic Germans, who had to wear white armbands after the war and so were easy to identify, began in four places in the city. They were beaten and bayonetted, shot or drowned in a fire pond. On the Elbe bridge, a German, Georg Schörghuber, shouted something provocative and was thrown into the river by the crowd, and shot by soldiers when he was trying to swim out. Soon other people, including a woman with a baby and pram, were thrown into the water and later shot at. The perpetrators were the Revolutionary Guards (a post-war paramilitary group), Czech and Soviet soldiers, and a group of unknown Czechs who had  recently arrived from elsewhere. Local Czechs, including the mayor, Josef Vondra, tried to help the victims. Finally, a state of emergency and a curfew were declared, and by 18:25, streets had been cleared by the army.

Count of victims
The estimated number of victims is 80–120, with 43 being accounted for specifically: 24 bodies gathered in the city were burned in the crematorium of the former concentration camp in Terezín on 1 August; a list was made of the 17 missing clerks from the Schicht factory, who were returning from work by way of the bridge at the time of the explosion; and two are mentioned in other sources. In Germany, several dozen bodies were recovered from the Elbe river in the following weeks; however, these could have come from elsewhere. The Sudeten Germans organisations give much higher numbers - from 400 up to 8,000.

Subsequent effects
The next day, 1 August, the government of Czechoslovakia established an investigation commission led by General Ludvík Svoboda. The commission was not able to discover the reason for the explosion but blamed it on the Werewolves (German saboteurs).

The explosion and subsequent massacre were used as a pretext by advocates of the expulsion of Germans from Czechoslovakia. During the Communist regime in Czechoslovakia (1948–1989) details of the event were suppressed, to the point of it being almost unknown to most Czechs.

Suspected communist involvement
After the 1989 Velvet Revolution, city archivist Vladimír Kaiser started to investigate the event, most recently publishing the results together with Jan Havel, another Ústí citizen, and German historian Otfrid Pustejovsky as Stalo se v Ústí nad Labem 31. července 1945 (Ústí nad Labem 2005, ; German translation Ein Nachkriegs-Verbrechen: Aussig 31. Juli 1945). While only indirect evidence survived, they conclude that the explosion and massacre were prepared by Communists within the Czechoslovak secret services, specifically Bedřich Pokorný, leader of Ministry of Interior's Defensive Intelligence (Obranné zpravodajství) department who earlier organised the Brno death march, in order to support the transfer of Germans from Czechoslovakia by presenting to the Potsdam Conference an argument that further cohabitation of Germans with Czechs was impossible. (Kaiser's 2000 hypothesis that the motive was the Western powers' interest in destroying the new Daimler-Benz DB 605 airplane engines also stored in the dump was found far-fetched and untenable.)

See also
 List of massacres in the Czech Republic
 Sudetenland

References

External links
  Massacre description by Vladimír Kaiser in 1995 city history
  Interview with Jan Havel 

Conflicts in 1945
1945 in Czechoslovakia
Massacres in 1945
Ethnic cleansing of Germans
Aftermath of World War II in Germany
Massacres in the Czech Republic
World War II massacres
German diaspora in Europe
World War II crimes
Mass murder in 1945
July 1945 events in Europe
Ústí nad Labem